This article refers to the river in Goiás, central Brazil: for the longer river of southern Brazil, Argentina and Paraguay, see Paraná River.  The difference between the two is in the diacritic on the final syllable.

The Paranã River is located in Goiás and Tocantins states, Brazil. It divides two regions - the Northeast and north-central Goiás. It is formed by tributaries that descend the Serra Geral, the mountains that divide eastern Goiás and Bahia. One of the most important tributaries is the Crixás, which has its source near Formosa. Farther to the north the Paranã becomes the main tributary of the Tocantins River on the right bank. Today it is crossed by a long concrete bridge between the municipalities of Iaciara and Nova Roma. It forms the valley which makes up a vast region called the Vão do Paranã Microregion.

See also
List of rivers of Goiás
List of rivers of Tocantins

References
Brazilian Ministry of Transport

Rivers of Goiás
Rivers of Tocantins